The 2021 Fight for the Fallen was the third annual Fight for the Fallen professional wrestling charity event produced by All Elite Wrestling (AEW). The event aired on TNT as a television special episode of AEW's weekly television program, Wednesday Night Dynamite. For the event's charitable cause, it helped support victims of domestic violence and sexual assault survivors. It was also the third and last event in AEW's "Welcome Back" tour, which celebrated AEW's resumption of live touring during the COVID-19 pandemic. The event was held on July 28, 2021, at the Bojangles Coliseum in Charlotte, North Carolina.

Six matches were contested at the event. In the main event, Chris Jericho defeated Nick Gage in a No Rules match. In other prominent matches, Lance Archer retained the IWGP United States Heavyweight Championship against Hikuleo, and The Elite (Kenny Omega, The Young Bucks (Matt Jackson and Nick Jackson), and The Good Brothers (Doc Gallows and Karl Anderson) defeated Adam Page and The Dark Order (Evil Uno, Stu Grayson, John Silver, and Alex Reynolds) in a 10-man tag team elimination match, preventing Page and The Dark Order from challenging for the AEW World Championship and AEW World Tag Team Championship, respectively.

Production

Background
Fight for the Fallen is a charity event held annually in July by All Elite Wrestling (AEW) since 2019. For the 2021 event's charitable cause, which was the third Fight for the Fallen event, AEW partnered with Safe Alliance, a non-profit organization dedicated to providing hope and healing for domestic violence and sexual assault survivors. In addition to AEW donating US$100,000 to Safe Alliance, a percentage of proceeds from the limited-edition Fight for the Fallen T-shirts were also donated.

Due to the COVID-19 pandemic that began effecting the industry in mid-March 2020, AEW held the majority of their programs from Daily's Place in Jacksonville, Florida; these events were originally held without fans, but the company began running shows at 10–15% capacity in August, before eventually running full capacity shows in May 2021. Also in May, AEW announced that they would be returning to live touring, beginning with a special episode of Dynamite titled Road Rager on July 7, which kicked off the "Welcome Back" tour. Fight for the Fallen  was scheduled as the third and last event of the "Welcome Back" tour and like the 2020 event, it was held as a special episode of Dynamite. It took place on July 28, 2021, in Charlotte, North Carolina at the Bojangles Coliseum.

Storylines
Fight for the Fallen featured professional wrestling matches that involved different wrestlers from pre-existing scripted feuds and storylines. Wrestlers portray heroes, villains, or less distinguishable characters in scripted events that built tension and culminated in a wrestling match or series of matches. Storylines were produced on AEW's weekly television program, Dynamite, the supplementary online streaming shows, Dark and Elevation, and The Young Bucks' YouTube series Being The Elite.

Event

Preliminary matches and segments
The event opened with The Elite (Kenny Omega, Matt Jackson, Nick Jackson, Doc Gallows and Karl Anderson) taking on Adam Page, Evil Uno, Stu Grayson, John Silver and Alex Reynolds in a 10-man tag team elimination match. Kenny Omega and The Elite entered in basketball jerseys, as the "Elite Squad", to "Get Ready for This" in reference to Space Jam. Since The Elite won, Adam Page could not challenge for the AEW World Championship. According to Being The Elite, the special entrance was a gift to Nick Jackson, who celebrated his birthday the day of the show.

After the opening match, Taz held a championship celebration for Ricky Starks, with a band playing live music. The celebration was interrupted by Brian Cage.

Next, FTR faced Santana and Ortiz. The match had to finish early after Cash Wheeler suffered an injury.

After that, Tony Schiavone announced AEW Rampage: The First Dance, to be held at the United Center in Chicago, Illinois on Friday, August 20; sparking rumors of an appearance by CM Punk. 

Later, Hikuleo (accompanied by King Haku) faced Lance Archer for the IWGP United States Heavyweight Championship. Archer retained, after which Hiroshi Tanahashi challenged him to a championship match at NJPW Resurgence.

Cody Rhodes was interviewed before being attacked by Malakai Black. The fight went on from the backstage area into the stage in front of the crowd, until Black knocked Rhodes out on the entrance ramp and several wrestlers and officials ran out to Rhodes' aid. 

In the fourth match, Christian Cage and Jurassic Express (Jungle Boy and Luchasaurus) beat the Hardy Family Office (Angelico and Private Party), accompanied by Matt Hardy. After the match, Christian was attacked by The Blade.

In the penultimate match, Thunder Rosa beat Julia Hart, in her first match after officially signing with AEW.

Main event 
In the main event, Chris Jericho faced Nick Gage in a No Rules match as part of "Labours of Jericho" set up by MJF, who joined commentary for this match. Match included many dangerous spots involving light tubes and glass but in the end, Jericho won. MJF then announced that next week, Jericho will face Juventud Guerrera.

After show 

After the main event (after the show went off-air), Tony Khan made an appearance in front of the crowd. The 100th episode of AEW Dark was filmed that night as well.

Reception

Attendance and television ratings
Two days before the event, PWInsider reported that the show was nearly sold-out. According to WrestleTix on Twitter, the show in Charlotte was attended by nearly 7,000, making it (at the time), third biggest TV taping in AEW history, behind the debut episode in Washington, D.C. and October 16, 2019 taping in Philadelphia, Pennsylvania.

Fight for the Fallen averaged 1,108,000 television viewers on TNT, with a 0.45 rating in AEW's key demographic. The show's audience peaked at 1,240,000 million, highest since the debut episode of Dynamite, which aired in October 2019.

Domino's Pizza commercial controversy
During the main event match, Nick Gage attacked Chris Jericho with a pizza cutter, before the show coincidentally went into a commercial for Domino's Pizza. A spokesperson for Domino's indicated that the brand may pull their advertising from Dynamite, stating they "are assessing our advertising presence on it going forward".

While speaking on the Sean Waltman podcast, Gage stated that "I didn't even know about Domino's until it was over and someone told me... I started laughing. What a coincidence." Nick Gage would also take to Twitter to write: "sorry dominos didnt mean to offend you guess im too ultraviolent for tv oh well ". Fellow AEW wrestler Jon Moxley would also label the occurrence as "a coincidence", and suggested that Domino's "needs to chill out".

One of the most subscribed YouTubers, PewDiePie, included this incident at the end of his "Bad Commercial Timing..." video.

Results

Tag team elimination match

See also
2021 in professional wrestling

References

External links

2021
2020s American television specials
2021 American television episodes
2021 in North Carolina
2021 in professional wrestling
Events in Charlotte, North Carolina
July 2021 events in the United States
Professional wrestling in Charlotte, North Carolina
Professional wrestling controversies